Graddonia is a fungal genus in the family Dermateaceae. This is a monotypic genus, containing the single species Graddonia coracina.

See also
List of Dermateaceae genera

References

Dermateaceae genera
Monotypic Helotiales genera